Shree Motilal Kanhaiyalal Fomra Institute of Technology , commonly known as SMK FIT, is an engineering college located in Chennai, Tamil Nadu, India. The college is approved by AICTE, New Delhi and affiliated to Anna University, Chennai. It is an ISO 9001:2015 certified Institution.

History
Shree Motilal Kanhaiyalal Fomra Institute of Technology was established in 2001 and is affiliated to Anna University. The founder of the college is Shree Motilal Kanhaiyalal who formed the Trust in the year 1995. The Institution is owned by the Fomra family, who also own the company Fomra Electricals.

Campus and location

The College is located in Thaiyur village near Kelambakkam on Old Mahabalipuram Road (I.T. Highway), 35 km from Chennai.
The College is spread over an area of 25 acres of land amidst a picturesque landscape.

	A serene and eco-friendly enclave with 5 academic blocks.

	Air-conditioned conference hall, board room, placement room, laboratories and two auditoriums with modern amenities and equipments.

	Well laid play fields for outdoor games like basketball, volleyball,  badminton etc.

	A library covering a wide range of subjects with separate reference sections.

	Canteen serving nutritious and vegetarian food cooked under healthy and sanitized conditions.

Library

The library at Shree Motilal Kanhaiyalal Fomra Institute of Technology is a powerhouse of knowledge and is situated in a separate building.
With two floors and an area of 986 square meters, the air- conditioned library stocks a large volume of books and periodicals.
The collections of volumes cover a wide range of Engineering subjects and other related fields of study.

Library Facilities:

	Open Access System.

	Online Facilities.

	Reference Section.

	Audio Visual Communication Centre.

Academic programs

SMK Fomra Institute of Technology offers the following UG and PG courses leading to the award of B.E. / M.E degree from Anna University, Chennai.

UG Courses:

B.E.	Biomedical Engineering(Permanently affiliated to ANNA UNIVERSITY)

B.E.	Civil Engineering (CIVIL)

B.E.	Computer Science and Engineering (CSE)(Permanently affiliated to ANNA UNIVERSITY)

B.E.	Electronics and Communication Engineering (ECE)

B.E.	Electrical and Electronics Engineering (EEE)

B.E.	Mechanical Engineering (MECH)

PG Courses:

M.E.	Computer Science and Engineering

M.E.	Power Systems Engineering

M.E.	VLSI Design

M.E.	Thermal Engineering

Student Development Cell

The student development cell focuses on the overall development of a student. 
The following Student associations are spearheaded by our own young student leaders to instill and pass on the leadership skills to their fellow students.

Scholarships

The college offers both Merit and Sports Scholarships for deserving students.

Eligibility

Eligibility for B.E:

Pass in 10+2 or equivalent examination, with a minimum aggregate of 45% marks for SC/ST AND 50% marks for other categories in Mathematics, Physics and Chemistry.

Eligibility for M.TECH/PG:

Candidates will be admitted as per Anna university norms.

References

External links
 
 Official Facebook Page
 Retrieved from The Hindu

Engineering colleges in Chennai
Colleges affiliated to Anna University
Educational institutions established in 2001
2001 establishments in Tamil Nadu